Ingeranna Krohn-Nydal is a Norwegian film director. Her film Amindas verden won the 1993 International Federation of Film Critics award at the International Leipzig Festival for Documentary and Animated Film. Krohn-Nydal's other work includes the 51 minute documentary on the life of Dagny Juel titled Død madonna (Dead Madonna).

References

External links
Dead Madonna - Dagny Juel Przybyszewska

Norwegian film directors
Norwegian women film directors
Living people
Year of birth missing (living people)